Tsagaan Agui (White Cave) or Tsagaan Cave located in southwest-central Mongolia, is a stratified Paleolithic cave site with a calcium carbonate crystal-lined internal chamber. The cave has yielded abundant archaeological materials, some perhaps as old as ca. 700,000 years ago. The cave has been (and continues to be) used sporadically by Buddhists as a pilgrimage destination. The cave has been under the protection of the Mongolian government since 1988.

Geographical location 
Tsagaan Agui is located in Bayankhongor province (aimaq) in the southern foothills of the Gobi Altay Mountains at 44º 42´ 43.3” N, 101 º 10´13.4” E, about 40 km northeast of the Bayan Lig county (suum) administrative center, southwest of the Zuun Bogd Uul (Baga Bogd Uul) mountain range.

History 
The cave was first investigated by the Joint Soviet-Mongolian Historical-Cultural Expedition in 1987. In 1988-1989, excavations were continued by the Soviet-Mongolian-Stone Age research team led by A. P. Derevianko and V. T. Petrin. Between 1995-2000, excavations were undertaken at Tsagaan Agui by the Mongolian-Russian-American Archaeological Expeditions (JMRAAE). JMRAAE reinitiated excavations at Tsagaan Agui in 2021 with support from the Leakey Foundation at the Je Tsongkhapa Endowment for Central and Inner Asian Archaeology.

Stratigraphy 
Tsagaan Agui consists of five parts: 1) the Entrance Terrace, 2) the Entrance Grotto, 3) the Main Chamber, 4) the Inner Chamber, 5) and the Lower Grotto.

Based on multiple analyses of the cave deposits, sedimentation occurred during four cycles:

 Strata 10–11 of cave’s entryway, Stratum 6 of lower grotto, Strata 13–14 of entry grotto, Strata 12–13 of main chamber. The wetter and warmer environment was witnessed. In this part of sedimentation, around 70–90 % of the pollen is associated with trees and shrubs. The remains of spruce, pine pollens were detected. 
 Strata 6–11 of Main Chamber, Stratum 5 of Lower Grotto. The cooler and drier environment than previously was witnessed. The investigations show that arboreal species such as pine, birch and spruce predominated in this part of sedimentation. The pollen of elm, maple, oak, lime, fir, honeysuckle, hornbeam was also discovered here.
 Lower part of Stratum 4 along with Stratum 5 of entryway zone, Strata 3–5 of Main Chamber. The cooler climate in comparison with the previous period was observed here. Steppe ecosystem was most noticeable despite the presence of forest complex. Among the spore and pollen findings, herbaceous and shrubby species predominated. However, the pollen of Picea, Pinus and Betula in smaller amounts were also detected.
 Stratum 2 of entryway, Entrance Grotto and Main Chamber. The drier environment was noticed than previously. The debris revealed in this part includes a mixture of gravel, limestone and calcite crystals.

Archaeological findings 
The earliest remains revealed from the cave belong to the first period of sedimentation (Stratum 13 of entrance grotto and Stratum 12–13 of the Main chamber). Bifacially worked tools, combination tools, flakes and retouched remnants were recovered here.

Different forms of cores and core preforms, core-like pieces, blade spalls, flakes and chips, only a few retouched platforms, just one faceted platform were revealed from the second part of sedimentation.

Levallois-like flake cores, core platforms, core-like pieces, a part of a Levallois blade and flakes were observed in the third cycle of sedimentation.

Remains of tools found from the fourth cycle are quite different from the artefacts of the previous cycles. Tools were prepared on high-quality raw material, and the core reduction strategy was mainly used in producing bladelets. Scrapers, end-scrapers, trimming tools, as well as retouched blades, burin-like tools, combination tools were also revealed in this horizon.

Based on the analysis of relics from the undermost horizons of Tsagaan Agui Cave, it is suggested that Levallois-Acheulean like industry existed in Mongolia as early as 500-400 thousand years ago. According to Derevianko and Okladnikov, similar technologies appeared in Central Asia because of the migration of population using bifacial technology to this region. It is also assumed that the bearers of Levallois-Acheulean traditional tools emigrated from central Kazakhstan (Balkhash lake region) to the South of Mongolia. The tools prepared with Levallois-like cores belonged to the Late Middle Paleolithic (early Zyrian glacial) period. In the cave were found blades belonging to the Early Upper Paleolithic period. These blades showed that the first Initial Upper Paleolithic blade technologies were presented in the Gobi around 27–33 ka (in the last half of the Karagan interstadial).

Flora and fauna remains 
Pollen of the broad-leaved species such as elm, hornbeam, maple, lime and grains of grasses including Moraceae, Lonicera, Juglans were detected. The Myrica and Ostryaseeds showed that they belonged to no later than Pleistocene.

The relatively humid environment was observed in the bottom parts of sedimentation arrangements, therefore remains of animals were only revealed from the upper scopes, especially from Strata 1–5 of the Main Chamber. Plain and mountain mammals such as kulan, arğalı, Siberian goat and dzeren (all are currently observed in Mongolia) predominated. Besides, bones of rhinoceros, cave hyenas and Tibetan antelope were discovered from the Pleistocene horizons.

See also 
 Mongolia
 List of caves
 History of Mongolia

References 

Archaeology of Mongolia
Caves of Mongolia